Salloomt Peak is a  high mountain in the Kitimat Ranges of the Coast Mountains in the Bella Coola Valley region of British Columbia, Canada.  It is located on the north side of the Bella Coola River between the communities of Firvale and Hagensborg.

See also
Salloomt River
List of place names in Canada of aboriginal origin

References

Bella Coola Valley
Kitimat Ranges